This Charming Man is a 2002 Danish short comedy film directed by Martin Strange-Hansen. It won an Oscar in 2003 for Best Short Subject.

Cast
 Martin Buch as Lars Hansen; El Hassan
 Camilla Bendix as Ida
 Farshad Kholghi as Omid
 Martin Hestbæk as Niels
 Michel Castenholt as Pelle
 Niels Martin Eriksen as Magnus
 Anette Støvelbæk as Receptionist Arbejdsformidlingen
 Charlotte Munksgaard as Amanda Pedersen
 Benjamin Boe Rasmussen as Nabo #1
 Thomas Baldus as Nabo #2
 Cecilie Thomsen as Guide på Kronborg

References

External links

2002 films
2002 short films
2000s Danish-language films
Danish short films
2002 comedy films
Live Action Short Film Academy Award winners
Danish independent films
Comedy short films
Danish comedy films
2002 independent films